Chromosome 13 is one of the 23 pairs of chromosomes in humans. People normally have two copies of this chromosome. Chromosome 13 spans about 113 million base pairs (the building material of DNA) and represents between 3.5 and 4% of the total DNA in cells.

Genes

Number of genes 
The following are some of the gene count estimates of human chromosome 13. Because researchers use different approaches to genome annotation their predictions of the number of genes on each chromosome varies (for technical details, see gene prediction). Among various projects, the collaborative consensus coding sequence project (CCDS) takes an extremely conservative strategy. So CCDS's gene number prediction represents a lower bound on the total number of human protein-coding genes.

Gene list 

The following is a partial list of genes on human chromosome 13. For complete list, see the link in the infobox on the right.

Diseases and disorders
The following diseases and disorders are some of those related to genes on chromosome 13:

 13q deletion syndrome
 Bladder cancer
 Breast cancer
 Heterochromia
 Hirschsprung's disease
 Maturity onset diabetes of the young type 4
 Nonsyndromic deafness
 Propionic acidemia
 Retinoblastoma
 Schizophrenia
 Waardenburg syndrome
 Wilson's disease
 Patau syndrome
 Chronic Lymphocytic Leukemia (Acquired defect)
 Young–Madders syndrome

Chromosomal conditions
The following conditions are caused by changes in the structure or number of copies of chromosome 13:

 Retinoblastoma: A small percentage of retinoblastoma cases are caused by deletions in the region of chromosome 13 (13q14) containing the RB1 gene. Children with these chromosomal deletions may also have intellectual disability, slow growth, and characteristic facial features (such as prominent eyebrows, a broad nasal bridge, a short nose, and ear abnormalities). Researchers have not determined which other genes are located in the deleted region, but a loss of several genes is likely responsible for these developmental problems.
 Trisomy 13: Trisomy 13 occurs when each cell in the body has three copies of chromosome 13 instead of the usual two copies. Trisomy 13 can also result from an extra copy of chromosome 13 in only some of the body's cells (mosaic trisomy 13). In a small percentage of cases, trisomy 13 is caused by a rearrangement of chromosomal material between chromosome 13 and another chromosome. As a result, a person has the two usual copies of chromosome 13, plus extra material from chromosome 13 attached to another chromosome. These cases are called translocation trisomy 13. Extra material from chromosome 13 disrupts the course of normal development, causing the characteristic signs and symptoms of trisomy 13. Researchers are not yet certain how this extra genetic material leads to the features of the disorder, which include severely abnormal cerebral functions, a small cranium, retardation, non functional eyes and heart defects.
 Other chromosomal conditions: Partial monosomy 13q is a rare chromosomal disorder that results when a piece of the long arm (q) of chromosome 13 is missing (monosomic). Infants born with partial monosomy 13q may exhibit low birth weight, malformations of the head and face (craniofacial region), skeletal abnormalities (especially of the hands and feet), and other physical abnormalities. Intellectual disability is characteristic of this condition. The mortality rate during infancy is high among individuals born with this disorder. Almost all cases of partial monosomy 13q occur randomly for no apparent reason (sporadic).

Cytogenetic band

References

External links

 
 

Chromosomes (human)